Vladimír Dravecký (born 3 June 1985) is a Slovak ice hockey player who is currently playing for the HC Ocelari Trinec in the Czech Extraliga.

Career
Dravecký is a product of the HC Košice youth system. He debuted at the Extraliga in the 2001–02 season. His breakthrough came in the 2003–04 season, playing 43 games in the regular season. On 21 May 2007, he signed a 2-year contract with the Los Angeles Kings. Dravecký then played with Kings affiliate the Manchester Monarchs for the next two seasons before his return to Europe to play in Kontinental Hockey League with HC Slovan Bratislava.

International play
Dravecký participated at the 2010 IIHF World Championship, playing 6 games for Slovakia without point.

External links

1985 births
Living people
Espoo Blues players
HC Ajoie players
HC Košice players
HC Oceláři Třinec players
HC Slovan Bratislava players
HC Prešov players
HC Yugra players
Manchester Monarchs (AHL) players
Molot-Prikamye Perm players
Reading Royals players
Sportspeople from Košice
Slovak ice hockey right wingers
Slovak expatriate ice hockey players in Russia
Slovak expatriate ice hockey players in the United States
Slovak expatriate ice hockey players in the Czech Republic
Slovak expatriate ice hockey players in Switzerland
Slovak expatriate ice hockey players in Finland